John Richard Simpson (February 13, 1932 – February 10, 2017) was the first U.S. Interpol President (1984–1988) and was the sixteenth Director of the United States Secret Service (1981–1992).

Born in 1932, Simpson served in the United States Army, graduated from Loyola College in Montreal before attending Portia Law School.

Simpson joined the Secret Service in 1962 during his time at Portia Law (graduating in 1964 and was elected as his Law School President) and became Special Agent with the Presidential Protective Division in 1978.

After retiring as Director in 1992, Simpson became a commissioner in the United States Parole Commission for 2 terms.

References

1932 births
United States Secret Service agents
2017 deaths
Interpol officials
Directors of the United States Secret Service
American lawyers
New England Law Boston alumni